Musolino is a surname. Notable people with the name include:

 Benedetto Musolino (1809–1885), Italian politician and soldier
 Enrico Musolino (1928-2010), Italian speed skater
 Giuseppe Musolino, Italian brigand
 Vincenzo Musolino, Italian actor, director, producer and screenwriter

See also
 Mussolini family
 Il Brigante Musolino, Italian biographical film about Giuseppe Musolino

surnames